Marrecus Keyontae Johnson (born May 24, 2000) is an American college basketball player for the Kansas State Wildcats of the Big 12 Conference. He previously played for the Florida Gators.

Early life and high school career
Johnson grew up in Norfolk, Virginia and originally attended Norview High School before transferring to IMG Academy in Bradenton, Florida before his junior year. He played at IMG for one season before transferring again to Oak Hill Academy in Mouth of Wilson, Virginia for his senior season after his head coach, Vince Walden, left the school to become an assistant coach at Arkansas State. During the Nike EYBL finals at Peach Jam, Johnson averaged 12.9 points and 7.6 rebounds per game. As a senior, he scored at least 18 points in 19 of Oak Hill's games. Rated a four-star recruit by 247Sports and ESPN (who also rated him as a top 100 recruit), Johnson committed to playing college basketball for Florida over an offer from Texas Tech while also receiving interest from Providence, Minnesota, Virginia Tech, Wake Forest and Georgia Tech.

College career
In 2018, Johnson began his true freshman season as a key reserve, and eventually became the Gators' starting small forward going into the team's game against Georgia. He started the final 20 games of the season, and finished the season with 8.1 points, 6.4 rebounds, and 1.3 assists per game.

Johnson averaged 13.7 points and 10 rebounds during the 2019 SEC men's basketball tournament, as the Gators went to the tournament semifinal. He scored 20 points and 12 rebounds in the opening round against Arkansas, a double-double.

On February 26, 2020, Johnson scored a career-high 25 points to go with 11 rebounds in an 81–66 win against LSU. As a sophomore, he averaged 14 points, 7.1 rebounds, 1.6 assists and 1.2 steals per game and was named first team All-SEC.

On December 12, 2020, Johnson collapsed on the court in a game at Florida State. When he arrived at Tallahassee Memorial Hospital, doctors assessed him to be in critical, but stable condition. After three days in a medically induced coma at Tallahassee Memorial, Johnson was taken back to Gainesville, Florida for further treatment. On December 15, it was reported that he was awake, speaking, and responding to commands. On December 28, head coach Mike White announced that Johnson had rejoined the team as a coach.

Johnson was announced as the honorary starter on Senior Day against Kentucky on March 5, 2022, and received a standing ovation. On May 1, he entered the transfer portal. On August 20, 2022, he committed to Kansas State. Johnson was named Big 12 Newcomer of the Year and joined teammate Markquis Nowell on the First Team All-Big 12.

Career statistics

College

|-
| style="text-align:left;"| 2018–19
| style="text-align:left;"| Florida
| 36 || 20 || 23.8 || .470 || .365 || .643 || 6.4 || 1.3 || 1.1 || .3 || 8.1
|-
| style="text-align:left;"| 2019–20
| style="text-align:left;"| Florida
| 31 || 31 || 31.3 || .544 || .380 || .768 || 7.1 || 1.6 || 1.2 || .3 || 14.0
|-
| style="text-align:left;"| 2020–21
| style="text-align:left;"| Florida
| 4 || 4 || 20.3 || .641 || .429 || .786 || 4.5 || 1.3 || 1.0 || .0 || 16.0
|-
| style="text-align:left;"| 2021–22
| style="text-align:left;"| Florida
| 1 || 1 || 0.0 ||  ||  ||  || .0 || .0 || .0 || .0 || .0
|- class="sortbottom"
| style="text-align:center;" colspan="2"| Career
| 72 || 56 || 26.5 || .521 || .376 || .721 || 6.5 || 1.4 || 1.1 || .3 || 11.0

Personal life
On March 16, 2022, Alachua County police filed a sworn complaint, claiming that Johnson sexually assaulted a woman.

References

External links
Kansas State Wildcats bio
Florida Gators bio

2000 births
Living people
All-American college men's basketball players
American men's basketball players
Basketball players from Norfolk, Virginia
Small forwards
Florida Gators men's basketball players
IMG Academy alumni
Kansas State Wildcats men's basketball players